Theerthadanam is a 2001 Indian Malayalam-language directed by G. R. Kannan and written by M. T. Vasudevan Nair based on his story Vanaprastham. The film stars Jayaram and Suhasini Maniratnam. The film met with critical acclaim. It was selected to be screened in 18 International Film Festival, which is a record at that time. Suhasini Maniratnam and K. S. Chithra  got Kerala State Film Awards for their works in the movie

Plot
The story of an old man and his student reunited after 36 years.

Cast
Jayaram as  Karunakaran
Suhasini as  Vinodini K. S. (voice dubbed by Thankamani)
 Monica as Young Vinodini
Ponnamma Babu as  Vinodini's Mother
 Kuttyedathi Vilasini as Parukutti
Rachana Narayanankutty as Vinodini's friend
Beeyar Prasad as Narayanan
K. Kaladharan as Swami
Master Kannan	
Master Sreeram	
Master Vignesh as Kannan
P. J. Radhakrishnan as Pattaru
Raj Mohan	
Swapna Ravi as Bhanumathi

Awards
Kerala State Film Awards  2001
 Best Actress - Suhasini Maniratnam
 Best Female Playback Singer - K. S. Chithra  ("Mooli Mooli")
 Best Dubbing Artist - Thankamani 
 Special Jury Award - Jayaram

References

External links
 

2001 films
2000s Malayalam-language films
2001 drama films
Films with screenplays by M. T. Vasudevan Nair
Films based on short fiction
Films scored by Kaithapram Damodaran Namboothiri